11